Tony Ferguson (born May 4, 1973) is a professional skateboarder and company owner. He was an original member of the Girl Skateboards team and is a partner in the Alife Footwear brand.

Early life
Tony was born in Edmonton, Alberta on May 4, 1973. His early years were spent in Ottawa, Ontario where he began skateboarding at age 12. His family moved to Vancouver, British Columbia in 1990. In 1994, he was living in Los Angeles, California.

Career
His first sponsor was the Tommy Guerrero and Jim Thiebaud-owned Real Skateboards where he stayed from 1990 until 1992. In 1992, he was asked by future Girl founder Rick Howard to join the legendary Plan B team. In 1993, along with a handful of other pros and cinematographer Spike Jonze, Ferguson helped start the Girl Skateboard Company.

After leaving professional skateboarding in 2005, he became involved with the New York City streetwear lifestyle brand Alife. He acquired the global license for Alife Footwear in the same year and oversees creative direction and production for the company. In recent years he’s also acted as a consultant for several notable footwear brands.

Videography
Plan B – Virtual Reality (1993)
Eric Koston Profile 411 VM (1993)
Girl Skateboards – Goldfish (1994)
Girl Skateboards – Mouse (1996)
Chocolate - Chocolate Tour (1999)
411 VM – Girl Chocolate (1999)
Girl Chocolate Euroblitz (2000)
Girl Skateboards – Yeah Right (2003)
North Two (2004)
Four Star North Of Everything (2008)
North (2009)
Crail Couch interview (2009)
Crailtap’s mini DV drawer mouse years (2010)
Crailtap’s mini DV drawer Yeah right years (2011)
Maolo’s tapes, 20 years of Girl (2013)
Vice Epicly Later’d – Koston Part 4 (2014)
Girl X Alife Budweiser commercial (2014)
Chocolate city series commercial (2014)

References

"Tony Ferguson on Bringing Skateboarding to Handcrafted Footwear". hypebeast.com. Retrieved 28 November 2015.
"RECAP RONE Global Launch Event". havenshop.ca. Retrieved 28 November 2015.
"Rone by Tony Ferguson". montecristomagazine.com. Retrieved 28 November 2015.
"Sneakers That Combine Skate Style With Dress Shoe Craftsmanship". gq.com. Retrieved 28 November 2015.
"RONE, A Luxury Shoe With Skateboard Appeal". likevancouver.ca. Retrieved 28 November 2015.
"Tony Ferguson tours Vancouver with HAVEN Shop." hypebeast.com.Retrieved 28 November 2015.
"Professional skateboarder turned shoe guru, Tony Ferguson, debuts new luxury footwear line". vancouversun.com.Retrieved 28 November 2015.
"Pro Skater Tony Ferguson Debuts Luxury Footwear Label Rone". highsnobiety.com.Retrieved 28 November 2015.
"Mixtape No. 14 Tony Ferguson". garrettleight.com. Retrieved 28 November 2015.
"Tony Ferguson’s Rone Luxury Shoe Line To Launch In August". footwearnews.com. Retrieved 28 November 2015.
"Former Pro Skater Tony Ferguson on His New Luxury Footwear Line RONE". thehundreds.com. Retrieved 28 November 2015.
"Talking Modern Luxury and Crooked Cops with Ex-Street Skater Tony Ferguson". vice.com. Retrieved 28 November 2015.
"Rone Shoes by Jeff Thorburn". theboardpress.ca. Retrieved 28 November 2015.
"Tony Ferguson’s Rone Luxury Shoe Line To Launch In August". footwearnews.com. Retrieved 28 November 2015.
"TONY FERGUSON LAUNCHES FOOTWEAR BRAND RONE". business.transworld.net. Retrieved 28 November 2015.
"Tony Ferguson to Launch RONE Footwear This Year". hypebeast.com. Retrieved 28 November 2015.
"RONE Footwear Launches Its First Silhouette". hypebeast.com. Retrieved 28 November 2015.
"RONE Footwear Launches New "Ninety Three" Style". hypebeast.com. Retrieved 28 November 2015.

1973 births
Living people
Canadian skateboarders
Sportspeople from Edmonton
Sportspeople from Vancouver